Bizzicu Rossu is an archaeological site in Corsica. It is located in the commune of Grossa.

References 

Archaeological sites in Corsica